The 2010 Rally Argentina was the 30th running of Rally Argentina and the third round of the 2010 Intercontinental Rally Challenge season. The rally consisted of 15 special stages and took place over 19–21 March 2010. The rally was also a round of the South American Rally Championship and the Argentine Rally Championship.

Introduction
The rally started in Villa Carlos Paz, a city in the center-north of the province of Córdoba, on Friday 19 March with a  super special stage in the town. The event was made up of 15 gravel stages covering a total of  all completed in daylight. The event on Saturday consisted of seven stages and was centred on the town of San Agustín and around Valle Hermoso on Sunday. The final stage was a repeat of the super special stage in Villa Carlos Paz.

Nasser Al-Attiyah was seeded number 1 in his Škoda Fabia S2000, with local Federico Villagra taking number 2 in his Ford Fiesta S2000. Other entrants included current championship leader Juho Hänninen and reigning champion Kris Meeke. A total of 63 cars took part in the event.

Results
Škodas dominated the event, winning all bar one stage of the event. After Kris Meeke won the opening stage in Villa Carlos Paz, Juho Hänninen took control of the rally on the second stage and never lost the lead. Hänninen won eleven of the remaining fourteen stages, as he won the rally by 51 seconds. The other two drivers to win a stage, Guy Wilks and Jan Kopecký finished second and third to complete a clean sweep of the podium for Škoda. Kopecký was the main beneficiary of the retirement of Meeke on the road section after stage fourteen, as the suspension spot-weld failed on the Northern Irish driver's Peugeot during the stage.

Overall

Special stages

References

External links 
 The official website for the rally
 The official website of the Intercontinental Rally Challenge

Argentina
Rally Argentina
Rally Argentina
Rally Argentina